Draba cuneifolia is a species of flowering plant in the family Brassicaceae known as the wedgeleaf draba or wedgeleaf whitlow-grass. This annual plant is native to the southern half of North America where it grows in open, rocky fields and other disturbed areas. The plant forms a basal cluster of leaves, which are thick, widely toothed, and coated in stiff hairs. It bolts one or more erect stems which may approach 40 centimeters in maximum height. Each hairy stem bears an inflorescence of up to 75 small white flowers that continue at intervals down the stem as the stem grows in height. This family and its plants are easy to identify with its 4 petals and 4 sepals arranged like a "cross", either in an "X" or "H" shape, thus the name "Cruciferae". Mustards have 6 stamens usually 4 are taller and 2 are shorter. Fruits are either a long thin silique or short often rounded silicle.

Distribution 
Draba cuneifolia is found throughout the southern United States, Baja California and northwest Mexico.

Conservation status 
The State of Illinois has listed Draba cuneifolia, Whitlow Grass as Endangered: The State of Ohio has listed Draba cuneifolia, Wedge-leaf Whitlow-grass as Threatened; The State of Kentucky has listed Draba cuneifolia, Wedge-leaf Whitlow-grass as Endangered; and The State of Tennessee has listed Draba cuneifolia, Wedge-leaved Whitlow-grass as a species of Special Concern.

Lookalikes 
Other species of Draba; more broadly, small species of Cardamine and other springtime mustards.

External links
Jepson Manual Treatment
USDA Plants Profile
Photo gallery

References 

cuneifolia